"Slow Down" is a song by the band Brand Nubian.  The song was recorded in 1990 and was released as a single on their 1990 debut album, One for All. "Slow Down" was later featured on the band's compilation album, The Very Best of Brand Nubian. The song notably samples the guitar riff and part of the chorus from "What I Am" by Edie Brickell. The song also samples  "Let's Take It to the Stage" by Funkadelic, as well as "Kool It (Here Come the Fuzz)" and "N.T." by Kool & the Gang.

Single track listing
 12" single

Charts

Notes 

Funk-rap songs
1991 songs
Elektra Records singles